OH MY LOVE is the 5th album of Zard and was released on June 4, 1994 under B-Gram Records label.

Chart performance
The album reached #1 rank in its first week of sales. It charted for 75 weeks and sold more than  2,000,000 copies.

Track listing
All lyrics written by Izumi Sakai and arranged by Masao Akashi.

Usage in media
Mō Sukoshi, Ato Sukoshi...: ending theme for TV Asahi drama "Lala Bye Keiji'93"
Kitto Wasurenai: theme song for drama "Shiratori Reiko de Gozaimasu!"
Kono Ai ni Oyogi Tsukaretemo: opening theme for drama "Ai to Giwaku no Suspense"

References 

Zard albums
1994 albums
Being Inc. albums
Japanese-language albums